Lucky Diaz is an American multiple Latin Grammy-winning, Grammy-nominated recording artist, producer, and author. Along with his wife Alisha Gaddis, he is the founding member of the group Lucky Diaz and The Family Jam Band (also known as The Lucky Band). Billboard recognized the band among Latin Children's Music Artists You Should Know, describing them as "kind of like a bilingual B-52's for kids" Diaz graduated from Berklee College of Music.

Awards 
With his group Lucky Diaz and the Family Jam Band, Diaz won a 2013 Latin GRAMMY Award for Best Latin Children's Album for ¡Fantastico! making Diaz and his wife Alisha Gaddis the first Americans to win a Latin GRAMMY.  The album Adelante was a 16th Annual Latin GRAMMY Awards nominee.  In 2019, the band won their second Latin Grammy Award for the album Buenos Diaz under the name The Lucky Band. The album Paseo Lunar was nominated for a 2020 Latin Grammy Award in the Children's category making this the fourth nomination for The Lucky Band.

The albums Crayon Kids (2021) and Los Fabulosos (2022) were nominated in the Best Children's Album category for the 64th Grammy Awards and 65th Grammy Awards respectively.

The band was the recipient of the Parent's Choice Gold Award from the Parent's Choice Foundation which rewards excellence in children's entertainment, for Oh Lucky Day (2011).

Discography 
Albums with Lucky Diaz and The Family Jam Band

 Luckiest Adventure (April 2010) CD Only
 Oh Lucky Day (April 2011)
 A Potluck (May 2012)
 ¡Fantastico! (May 2013) - Best Latin Children's Album GRAMMY Winner, 2013
 Lishy Lou and Lucky Too (October 2013)
 Aquí, Allá (May 2014)
 Adelante (May 2015) - Best Latin Children's Album GRAMMY Nominee, 2015
 Greatest Hits Vol 1 (July 2016)
 Made in LA (July 2017)
 Hold Tight, Shine Bright (August 2018)
 Buenos Diaz (April 2019)
 Paseo Lunar (May 2020)
 Crayon Kids (June 2021)
 Los Fabulosos (April 2022)

Books 
Lucky Diaz published his first children's book Paletero Man with HarperCollins Children's Books, in June 2021.  His second book with illustrator Micah Player La Guitarrista is set to release May 2, 2023.

Personal life 
Diaz met his wife Alisha Gaddis at The Comedy Store in Los Angeles, California. They married in 2012 and are raising two children together.

References

Living people
Latin Grammy Award winners
21st-century American musicians
21st-century American writers